Coventry South is a constituency represented in the House of Commons of the UK Parliament since 2019 by Zarah Sultana of the Labour Party.

Members of Parliament

MPs 1950–1974

MPs 1997–present

Constituency profile and boundaries

Coventry city centre is in the north of the constituency, with its cathedral, expanses of concrete offices and the university, which leads to a significant student vote in the seat. The residential tower blocks in St Michael's ward lie amid one of the most deprived areas in the country but south of the city centre it is more mixed, with the more middle-class areas of Cheylesmore, Earlsdon and Whoberley, Cannon Park, Gibbet Hill (aka Wainbody) and Westwood Heath among areas with large numbers of professionals, comfortably self-employed and academics.

1997–present: The City of Coventry wards of Binley and Willenhall, Cheylesmore, Earlsdon, St Michael's, Wainbody, and Westwood.

1950–1974: The County Borough of Coventry wards of Cheylesmore, Earlsdon, Godiva, St Michael's, Westwood, and Whoberley.

From 1974 to 1997, the city centre was part of the now abolished Coventry South East constituency.

History
The constituency was created for the 1950 general election, abolished for the February 1974 general election and recreated for the 1997 general election by the merger of the former seats of Coventry South East and Coventry South West. Since 1964 the various forms of the seat, excluding the gap period, have elected the Labour candidate. The Conservative candidates, since a win in 1959, have consistently taken second place. In 2019, following the retirement of Jim Cunningham, Labour narrowly held onto the seat by 401 votes; the Conservatives made their best performance since the seat's recreation,

In 2015, the local UKIP party originally selected Mark Taylor as candidate, but he stood aside when instructed to by "party bosses." UKIP wanted to replace Taylor with "anti-gay Christian preacher" George Hargreaves. The following week, Taylor was reinstated as candidate.

Elections

Elections in the 2010s

Elections in the 2000s

Election in the 1990s

Election in the 1970s

Elections in the 1960s

Elections in the 1950s

See also
 List of parliamentary constituencies in the West Midlands (county)

Notes

References

Parliamentary constituencies in Coventry
Constituencies of the Parliament of the United Kingdom established in 1950
Constituencies of the Parliament of the United Kingdom disestablished in 1974
Constituencies of the Parliament of the United Kingdom established in 1997